Nebula Man is a fictional character in DC Comics. He first appeared in Justice League of America #100–101 (1972).

Originally a villain responsible for the disappearance of the Seven Soldiers of Victory, he has since reappeared as Neh-Buh-Loh, the primary antagonist in the 2005–2006 mega-series Seven Soldiers by Grant Morrison. Before this reappearance Morrison built up the character's backstory, starting in 1997 with more extensive appearances in JLA: Classified (2005).

Fictional character biography
The Neh-Buh-Loh is in fact the adult version of a sentient universe called Qwewq. He first appeared as the Nebula Man in Justice League of America #100, described as a cosmic being "whose touch has the power of 20 atomic bombs". He was supposedly created by a villain known as The Hand to defeat the original Seven Soldiers of Victory (a later retcon would give him his current origin, with The Hand's involvement being more incidental). He battled the Soldiers in Tibet. His actions scattered the Soldiers through time, a fate from which they were later saved by the Justice League and Justice Society. The Nebula Man was defeated when the sidekick of the Crimson Avenger, Wing, sacrificed himself to deliver the final blow with a cosmic device; Wing was buried in Tibet by monks who witnessed his death. 

During the JLA storyline "Rock of Ages", the Flash, Aquaman, and Green Lantern are sent by Metron through time and space and they land on Wonderworld. During a brief tour of Wonderworld's Omnitropolis and its museum district by that world's Atom analogue Mote, a few peculiar items are mentioned. Amongst them are an evil 5 dimensional imp trapped in a 6 dimensional bottle, a speedster Glimmer's treadmill, and a larval universe they call Qwewq. They say that they are feeding it and hope to allow it to grow to its full potential.

The Nebula Man appeared once more in Stars and S.T.R.I.P.E., before reappearing in JLA: Classified #1–3, working with Gorilla Grodd and announcing the end of the world. At the same time, the Justice League were in the Infant Universe of Qwewq, unaware that this was Neh-Buh-Loh's larval form.

In the Seven Soldiers series, Neh-Buh-Loh was revealed to be allied with (or perhaps created by) the Sheeda, time travelling predators from the end of time. He served as the personal huntsman of the Sheeda Queen Gloriana Tenebrae. In the past, Neh-Buh-Loh had been sent to slay the queen's innocent stepdaughter Rhiannon (a.k.a. Misty Kilgore). However, moved by her beauty and symmetry, he could not bear to do it and allowed the girl to escape. This was Neh-Buh-Loh's secret shame for many years.

It was further explained that in the 1940s, Neh-Buh-Loh had been summoned (rather than created) by The Hand using a sonic horn. The creature was seeking "seven soldiers" who were prophesied to one day defeat his mistress, Gloriana. The Hand was all too eager to point him in the right direction, thus leading to the original Seven Soldiers becoming lost in time.

This same sonic horn was used by The Hand's nephew Boy Blue to once again summon Neh-Buh-Loh and the Sheeda in the present, leading to the destruction of an ad hoc Seven Soldiers team created by the original Vigilante. This set the stage for the Harrowing of Earth which the heroes of the Seven Soldiers series attempted to prevent.

Neh-Buh-Loh was finally defeated by Frankenstein, who capitalized on a flaw placed in him as an infant by the Ultramarine Corps, a team of heroes who had entered Qwewq seeking redemption.

Allusions
The use of Neh-Buh-Loh in Seven Soldiers is influenced by several characters in myth and legend. His failed mission to kill his queen's lovely stepdaughter is a direct parallel with the fairy tale of Snow White. 

In addition, his role as the horned Huntsman of the Sheeda has elements of characters from Celtic mythology such as the horned god Cernunnos and later legends such as the King of the Wild Hunt and Herne the Hunter.

Other versions
In All-Star Superman #10, Superman uses the infant universe of Qwewq to create an Earth without a Superman that he dubs Earth Q.

References

External links
 A brief biography on Nebula Man
 

Characters created by Dick Dillin
Characters created by Len Wein
Comics characters introduced in 1972
DC Comics characters with superhuman strength
DC Comics supervillains
DC Comics deities